The Goldenwest Diamond Corporation, which does business as The Jewelry Exchange, is a diamond importer and manufacturer in the United States. It has 15 locations across the United States, with its headquarters located in Tustin, California.

History
The business was founded in 1977 by Bill Doddridge when he purchased Buena Park Loans & Jewelry, a pawnshop.

In 1988, the company discontinued the pawnshop side of its business in order to focus on jewelry.

References

External links
Official website

Online jewelry retailers of the United States
Companies based in Los Angeles County, California
American companies established in 1977
Retail companies established in 1977